Christ Episcopal Church is a historic Episcopal church on NY 20 in Duanesburg, Schenectady County, New York. It was built in 1793 and is a two-story, rectangular meeting house with a freestanding tower.  The square tower with octagonal spire was erected in 1811.  Also on the property is a contributing carriage shed and cemetery.  General William North (1755 – 1836), who owned the nearby North Mansion and Tenant House, is buried in the crypt.  The church possesses a historic pipe organ, ca. 1848, by Augustus Backus of Troy, New York.

The property was covered in a 1984 study of Duanesburg historical resources.
It was listed on the National Register of Historic Places in 1987.

Gallery

References

External links

 Church website

Episcopal church buildings in New York (state)
Churches on the National Register of Historic Places in New York (state)
Historic American Buildings Survey in New York (state)
Churches completed in 1793
Churches in Schenectady County, New York
18th-century Episcopal church buildings
National Register of Historic Places in Schenectady County, New York
1793 establishments in New York (state)